Nina Kuscsik (born January 2, 1939) is a retired female long-distance runner from the United States, who has participated in over 80 marathons.

She was the first woman to officially win the Boston Marathon, which occurred in 1972. Alongside Beth Bonner, Kuscsik became the second American woman to complete a marathon in under three hours, running a time of 2:56:04 at the 1971 New York City Marathon (Bonner did so in the same race with 2:55:22).

Kuscsik is a former American women's record-holder for a 50-mile run, through her run of 6:35:53 in 1977 in Central Park, New York. She continued running into her later years and was the first woman to finish the Empire State Building Run-Up in 1979, 1980 and 1981.

Before she took up running, she was New York State women's speed skating champion, New York State women's roller-skating champion, and New York State women's bicycling champion, all in the same year. She started running because her bicycle broke and she needed another way of being active.   Kuscsik believes that running creates a sense of calmness that is applicable to other parts of life   

She was instrumental in influencing the U.S. Amateur Athletic Union, in late 1971, to increase its maximum distance for sanctioned women's races, leading to official participation by women in marathons, beginning at Boston in 1972.

Kuscsik was the only woman to participate in the first New York City Marathon in 1970. She did not feel well and had to drop out without finishing. In the following year she was one of four female finishers.

In 1972 Kuscsik won the New York City Marathon. That year Kuscsik, Pat Barrett, Lynn Blackstone, Liz Franceschini, Cathy Miller, and Jane Muhrke protested the rule of the Amateur Athletic Union that women marathoners had to start their race ten minutes before or after the men, which as implemented by the New York City Marathon that year meant that women had to start running ten minutes before the men. The women protested by sitting down and waiting ten minutes while holding signs protesting the rule, before starting to run when the men started; they became known as the NYC Six due to their protest. Ten minutes were added to their times. The ten minutes’ difference requirement was dropped later in 1972.

Kuscsik is a mother of three. She raised her two sons and one daughter in South Huntington, New York, in a house she bought in 1965 with her husband at the time.

Marathons
All results regarding marathon, unless stated otherwise

References

External links 
Profile
1973 World Marathon Rankings

21st-century American women
1939 births
Living people
American female long-distance runners
American female marathon runners
Boston Marathon female winners
New York City Marathon female winners
20th-century American women